The 1978–79 Minnesota North Stars season was the team's 12th season in the NHL. In the off season, the North Stars were on the verge of folding, and were merged with the Cleveland Barons, another team on the brink of collapse. The merged franchise continued as the Minnesota North Stars, with the old logo and colors. The changes for the franchise were new ownership and new management. Former Cleveland Barons General Manager Harry Howell assumed the coaching duties from Lou Nanne, who was named General Manager.  Former Barons owner George Gund III became a co-owner of the North Stars.  Howell's tenure as head coach would last just eleven games before he was replaced by Glen Sonmor.

While the merger allowed the North Stars ice a stronger team, it also saw the North Stars take the Barons' place in the tough Adams Division. The North Stars finished with 68 points, which was a substantial improvement over either the Barons' or North Stars' performance the previous season. Had the North Stars still been in the Smythe Division, that would have been good enough for second place and a playoff berth, but it was not enough to lift the team out of last place in the Adams. Minnesota missed the playoffs for the 5th time in 6 years. One of the highlights was Bobby Smith winning the Calder Trophy.

Offseason

NHL Draft

Regular season

Final standings

Game log

Transactions

Trades

Player stats

Skaters

Note: GP  =  Games played; G  =  Goals; A  =  Assists; Pts  =  Points; +/-  =  Plus/minus; PIM  =  Penalty minutes

Goaltenders
Note: GP  =  Games played; TOI  =  Time on ice (minutes); W  =  Wins; L  =  Losses; OT  =  Overtime losses; GA  =  Goals against; SO  =  Shutouts; SV%  =  Save percentage; GAA  =  Goals against average

Playoffs

Awards and records

References
 North Stars on Hockey Database

Minnesota North Stars seasons
Minnesota North Stars
Minnesota North Stars
Minnesota North Stars season
Minnesota North Stars season